Marcélia Cartaxo (born 27 October 1963) is a Brazilian actress. She has appeared in more than 30 films and television shows since 1985. She won the Silver Bear for Best Actress at the 36th Berlin International Film Festival for her role in Hour of the Star.

Selected filmography
 Hour of the Star (1985)
 Amélia (2000)
 Madame Satã (2002)
 The History of Eternity (2014)
  (2020)

References

External links

1963 births
Living people
Brazilian film actresses
People from Paraíba
Silver Bear for Best Actress winners
Brazilian television actresses
20th-century Brazilian actresses
21st-century Brazilian actresses